James or Jimmy Jim McColl or MacColl may refer to:
James McColl (musician), Scottish musician
James McColl (politician) (1844–1929), Australian politician
Jimmy McColl (footballer, born 1892) (1892–1978), Scottish footballer
Jimmy McColl (footballer, born 1924) (1924–2013), Scottish footballer
Jim McColl (footballer) (1933–2013), Australian rules footballer
Jim McColl (born 1951), Scottish businessman
James MacColl (1908–1971), British politician
Jim McColl, presenter of the gardening programme The Beechgrove Garden